Thomas Goreau may refer to:

 Thomas F. Goreau (1924–1970), marine biologist
 Thomas J. Goreau, his son, biogeochemist and marine biologist